Wihan Daeng is a district (amphoe) in southern part of Saraburi province, central Thailand.

History 
Tambon Nong Mu of Nong Khae district was separated to create the minor district (king amphoe) Nong Mu in 1937. The district office was moved to Ban Lam in 1957. The minor district was upgraded tom a full district and renamed to Wihan Daeng on 12 April 1961.

Etymology 
The word Wihan Daeng comes from the Buddhist Red Wihara of Lawa people in Ban Lam area, which was built by red bricks. The Red Wihara does not exist anymore.

Geography  
Neighboring districts are (from the west clockwise) Nong Khae, Mueang Saraburi, Kaeng Khoi of Saraburi Province, Ban Na of Nakhon Nayok province, and Nong Suea of Pathum Thani province.

Administration 
The district is divided into six sub-districts (tambons).

References 

Wihan Daeng